James W. "Jimmy" Smith (born c. 1905) was an American Thoroughbred horse trainer. He was the son of Tom Smith, trainer of Seabiscuit.

James Smith trained for automotive industrialist Charles T. Fisher and won the 1940 Arlington Classic with Fisher's colt, Sirocco. A few years later he trained for the renowned owner of Idle Hour Stock Farm, Edward R. Bradley, for whom he 
earlier rode as a jockey, riding and winning on such stars of the turf Black Helen at 2 and Blue Larkspur at 4, among others.

Along with his father, James Smith trained for Maine Chance Farm. On February 15, 1949, James W. Smith trained his last horse for  Maine Chance Farm, winning the feature race at Florida's Hialeah Park Race Track with Royal Blood.  In 1946 he had three horses in the Kentucky Derby, the best finish a fourth place with Lord Boswell. James Smith's last Derby entrant was in 1961 with Jay Fox. James trained Champions Busher, By Jimminy, Bridal Flower, Myrtle Charm.  He also trained Champions But Why Not (SW), Star Pilot (SW), note link takes you to non thoroughbred related content and Beaugay (multiple SW).

References
 Tom and James Smith at the Washington Racing Hall of Fame

Year of death missing
1905 births
American horse trainers